"All for Leyna" is a song by Billy Joel from the 1980 album Glass Houses. "All for Leyna" was released as a single in the United Kingdom, where it reached #40 on the UK Singles Chart.

The lyrics tell the story of the protagonist who meets a girl named Leyna, and, after a one-night stand, becomes obsessed with her. A performance music video was made featuring Joel and his band in the studio. The video prominently features Joel playing a Yamaha CP-80 electric grand piano and an Oberheim OB-X synthesizer.

Versions and covers
The video version differs from the album version. The music track is the same but a new vocal was recorded.

The band Gods of Mount Olympus covered the song in their single "Visitor".

Chart positions

References

1979 songs
1980 singles
Billy Joel songs
Songs written by Billy Joel
Song recordings produced by Phil Ramone
Columbia Records singles
Songs about stalking